Ahmad Yunus bin Mohd Alif (born 27 May 1958 in Terengganu) or better known as Yunus Alif is a former Malaysian football player. He is currently the head coach of Malaysia FAM League club Real Mulia F.C. As a player, he spent the majority of his career as a striker for Pahang FA in its golden era of the 1980s.
He was a member of the Malaysia national football team.

Career

As player 
He played for Terengganu FA and Pahang FA, winning the 1983 Malaysia Cup with Pahang. Yunus was also a fixture in the Malaysia national football team in the 80's. He won the league Agatas Golden Boot in 1984.

As a coach 
After his playing career, Yunus stayed with Pahang FA and started his coaching career as assistant coach to Tajuddin Nor in 1991. When Tajuddin were promoted to team manager in 1995, Yunus was appointed as head coach replacing Tajuddin. He guided Pahang to Malaysia Cup finals in 1995 and 1997, though both times they ended up as runners-up to Selangor FA. Pahang also won the 1995 M-League title, and runners-up in the 1995 Malaysia FA Cup final with Yunus at the helm.

He was appointed as head coach of Terengganu FA in 1998, replacing Abdul Rahman Ibrahim who was appointed as new head coach of Malaysia national football team. With Terengganu, Yunus won the 2000 Malaysia FA Cup after being runners-up a year before.

Later he returned to Pahang for two seasons, also taking the job as team manager, before taking the Penang FA helm as head coach in 2004. After only one season with Penang, he returned to Terengganu, where he held the head coach job for four years until the end of 2008.

In 2009, he was appointed the head coach of club side Proton FC in what was to be the final season of the club in the Malaysia league. In April 2010, he was appointed the new head coach of Perlis FA, replacing Muhammad Nidzam Adzha.

Yunus returned to Terengganu when club side PBDKT T-Team FC appointed him as head coach in 2011. After ending his contract with T-Team in 2012, he returned to Perlis FA as head coach for the 2013 Malaysia Premier League campaign. Yunus moved again after the season ended, this time to 2014 Malaysia Premier League newcomers PBAPP FC.

Personal 
His brothers Abdah Alif and Najib Alif were also footballers, with Abdah also played with Malaysia.

References

External links
 Last crack for Yunus
 Yunus Alif profile at Goal.com

1958 births
Living people
Malaysian people of Malay descent
Perlis FA managers
Malaysian football managers
Malaysian footballers
Malaysia international footballers
Sri Pahang FC players
Terengganu FC players
People from Terengganu
Sri Pahang FC managers
Southeast Asian Games silver medalists for Malaysia
Southeast Asian Games medalists in football
Association football forwards
Competitors at the 1981 Southeast Asian Games